SC Geislingen is a German association football club from the city of Geislingen, Baden-Württemberg established 31 May 1900. The football department became independent on 1 July 1911 and later took on the name Fußballverein 1919 Geislingen. In the years immediately before and after World War II, Geislingen flirted with promotion to first and second division football, but failed to advance in three attempts, instead remaining a third or fourth tier side until the mid-1990s.

The club's best known player was Jürgen Klinsmann, who spend four years of his youth career at SC Geislingen from 1974 to 1978, before joining Stuttgarter Kickers.



History
German football was reorganized into 15 regional top-flight divisions in 1933 and at the end of the 1936–37 season SC took part in group qualification play for the Gauliga Württemberg (I), but failed to advance after finishing fifth in their group.

After the war, sports and football clubs across the country were dissolved by occupying Allied authorities as part of the process of denazification. The club was reestablished in May 1946 as SC Geislingen and became part of the Amateurliga Württemberg (III) in 1952 and, later in 1960, the Amateurliga Nordwürttemberg. Following a first-place result in 1959 and a second-place finish the next season, the team took part in promotion playoffs for the 2. Liga-Süd (II), but did poorly on both occasions, and missed advancing.

SC struggled through the 1970s, moving up and down between Amateurliga and Verbandsliga play. By the mid-1980s they had settled in as a lower table side in what had become the Amateuroberliga Baden-Württemberg (III), with the exception of the 1986–87 and 1991–92 seasons spent in the Verbandsliga Württemberg (IV).

The team has made three appearances (1982, 1985, 1990) in play for the DFB Pokal (German Cup). Their best run came in 1985 when they upset Bundesliga side Hamburger SV (2:0) in the opening round and then defeated Kickers Offenbach (4:2) before being put out by a second Bundesliga club, Bayer Uerdingen, (0:2) in the third round as that club made its way to the cup final where they beat Bayern Munich.

Geislingen dropped out of the Oberliga in 1996 and out of the Verbandsliga two years later and has been unable to reach former heights since then.

Former players

  Thorsten Walther

Honours
The club's honours:
 Verbandsliga Württemberg
 Champions: 1987
 Bezirksliga Neckar/Fils (VIII)
 Champions: 2011
 Runners up: 1984, 1992
 Württemberg Cup
 Winners: 1984, 1989

Recent seasons
The recent season-by-season performance of the club:

 With the introduction of the Regionalligas in 1994 and the 3. Liga in 2008 as the new third tier, below the 2. Bundesliga, all leagues below dropped one tier.

References

External links
Official team site
SC Geislingen profile at Weltfussball.de
Das deutsche Fußball-Archiv historical German domestic league tables 

Football clubs in Germany
Football clubs in Baden-Württemberg
Association football clubs established in 1911
1900 establishments in Germany